Franco José León Genit (born 12 July 1998) is a Peruvian footballer who plays as a centre-back for Lucera Calcio.

Club career

Early years
León is a product of Alianza Lima. In May 2015, he went on a trial at Hércules CF since he also had a European passport. The trial went well and he was offered to return in August. During the trial, León also played a friendly game for the club's B-team. However, he never officially signed for the club.

Deportivo Municipal
León joined Deportivo Municipal from Alianza Lima in 2016 and was later promoted to the club's reserve team, where he also became the captain. After good performances, he was called up for two Peruvian Primera División games in 2017, however, he remained on the bench in both games. He made his official debut on 25 November 2018 against Sport Huancayo.

In 2019, León was loaned out to UTC Cajamarca, where he made six appearances. He returned to Deportivo Municipal for the 2020 season.

Juan Aurich
In the summer 2020, León moved to Juan Aurich in the Peruvian Segunda División. With seven games played for the team, he left the club at the end of 2020.

Carlos Stein
In April 2021, León joined fellow second division club FC Carlos Stein.

Return to Juan Aurich
In August 2021 it was reported, that León had returned to Juan Aurich. He made a total of four appearances for the club.

Lucera Calcio
On 22 December 2021 it was confirmed, that León had signed with Italian Promozione club Lucera Calcio.

References

External links
 
 

Living people
1998 births
Association football defenders
Peruvian footballers
Peruvian expatriate footballers
Peruvian Primera División players
Deportivo Municipal footballers
Universidad Técnica de Cajamarca footballers
Juan Aurich footballers
FC Carlos Stein players
Peruvian expatriate sportspeople in Italy
Expatriate footballers in Italy